So Evil, So Young is a 1961 British Technicolor reform school prison film produced by the Danzigers, directed by Godfrey Grayson, and starring Jill Ireland and Ellen Pollock.

Synopsis

Lucy and Claire are at a house where Lucy used to work. The two of them hack into the safe behind a picture. Inside are several jewels. Claire warns Lucy to leave, but Lucy says that the home-owners are on vacation and the butler is the only one at home; however, he is at the back of house. She says that they have all the time in the world. However, a few seconds later the butler walks in on them. He sees Lucy and recognizes her, but does not see Claire; Claire whacks him on the head with something, knocking him out.

Lucy tells Claire to take the jewels and give her half when she gets out of prison, where she will undoubtedly go. She heads to a local club where she sees her ex-boyfriend Tom eyeing his new girlfriend Anne (Jill Ireland). Jealous and angry, she takes a necklace she kept in her jacket pocket, which she stole from the house, and puts it in Anne's jacket pocket, without anyone seeing.

The police come to Anne's house and ask her if she knows of any stolen jewellery, for Lucy has told the police that she was her accomplice. Anne denies and but the police find the necklace in her coat pocket. She is sentenced to three years in Wilsham, a prison with no bars on the windows and they rely on your honour not to just walk out. They also do not like to call it a prison.

Everybody comes to hate the warden of the girls, Miss Smith. Anne, as she was a secretary before coming to Wilsham, is told to help the mistress with her secretary business, which Anne accepts willingly. Meanwhile, Lucy starts to pit all the girls against Anne, except for one, Marie, who has served four years in Wilsham and is getting out in one week.

The girls decide to have a party for Marie and when the warden is gone, they have pie and celebrate. However the warden hears the noise just before she leaves and goes to investigate. Oblivious with her eyes closed, Marie continues dancing around while the warden is still in the room. The warden tells her that she may have another 12 months in prison for this and then takes her away. In the morning when they go to work the girls find that Marie has hanged herself.

When questioned about if anything she could have said indirectly have caused Marie to hang herself, the warden denies this. One of the girls talks to Anne and apologizes for their actions towards her and tells Anne that she knows she's innocent of the crime she was accused of committing. She tells her to talk to Dear Old Margen and leaves it at that.

The girls then start a riot led by Lucy and the girl who talked to Anne earlier. They hurt Miss Smith's arm and trash the kitchen. The only one that doesn't participate in the riot is Anne. All the girls are sentenced to a punishment except Anne. She asks the mistress if she can have the same punishment as the rest of the girls, and the mistress hesitantly complies.

Anne than climbs out the window after stealing the mistress' coat, tells Tom to talk to Dear Old Margen, and then turns herself in to the police. Her sentence is extended. Tom finds Dear Old Margen, the owner of a pawn shop, who reveals that Claire pawned all the jewels and told him a false story. He checks the police record for stolen jewellery and finds all the pieces there. He calls the police who find Claire and bring her into the station. They also bring Lucy into the station who denies that Claire is her partner; however, when she finds out that Claire pawned all the jewels, she becomes outraged and has a fight with her, and then tells the police that Claire really was her accomplice.

Anne is released from prison.

Cast
 Jill Ireland as Ann
 Ellen Pollock as Miss Smith
 John Charlesworth as Tom
 Jocelyn Britton as Lucy
 Joan Haythorne as Matron
 Olive McFarland as Jane
 John Longden as Turner
 Sheila Whittingham as Mary
 Colin Tapley as Inspector
 C. Denier Warren as Sam
 Bernice Swanson as Claire
 Annette Kerr as Workroom Wardress
 Gwendolyn Watts as Edna
 Constance Fecher as Cell Wardress

Critical reception
Richard Harland Smith wrote for TCM.com, "shameless recyclers of their own material, the Danzigers reshuffled elements of So Young So Bad (1950) (Paul Henreid as a progressive psychiatrist who attempts to rehabilitate youth offenders) with the "wrongly accused protagonist" plots of Sentenced for Life (1960) and Man Accused (1959) to create So Evil, So Young... derivative in concept, So Evil, So Young strived for novelty by being one of the Danziger's only films shot in Technicolor". Sky Movies called the film, "an offbeat movie drama which takes a grim look at a women's reformatory. Jill Ireland, now married to screen tough guy Charles Bronson, is both fetching and effective in the central role". TV Guide wrote, "the cruelties of reform school are realistically exposed," adding, "this film has never been shown theatrically in the US, but it should be."

References

External links 
 

1961 films
1961 drama films
British drama films
Films directed by Godfrey Grayson
United Artists films
Films shot at New Elstree Studios
1960s English-language films
1960s British films